Farkas' lemma is a solvability theorem for a finite system of linear inequalities in mathematics. It was originally proven by the Hungarian mathematician Gyula Farkas.
Farkas' lemma is the key result underpinning the linear programming duality and has played a central role in the development of mathematical optimization (alternatively, mathematical programming). It is used amongst other things in the proof of the Karush–Kuhn–Tucker theorem in nonlinear programming.
Remarkably, in the area of the foundations of quantum theory, the lemma also underlies the complete set of Bell inequalities in the form of necessary and sufficient conditions for the existence of a local hidden-variable theory, given data from any specific set of measurements.

Generalizations of the Farkas' lemma are about the solvability theorem for convex inequalities, i.e., infinite system of linear inequalities. Farkas' lemma belongs to a class of statements called "theorems of the alternative": a theorem stating that exactly one of two systems has a solution.

Statement of the lemma 
There are a number of slightly different (but equivalent) formulations of the lemma in the literature. The one given here is due to Gale, Kuhn and Tucker (1951).

Here, the notation  means that all components of the vector  are nonnegative.

Example 
The lemma says that exactly one of the following two statements must be true (depending on b1 and b2):
 There exist x1 ≥ 0, x2 ≥ 0 such that 6 x1 + 4 x2 = b1 and 3 x1 = b2,  or
 There exist y1, y2 such that 6 y1 + 3 y2 ≥ 0, 4 y1 ≥ 0, and b1 y1 + b2 y2 < 0.

Here is a proof of the lemma in this special case:
 If b2 ≥ 0 and b1 − 2b2 ≥ 0, then option 1 is true, since the solution of the linear equations is x1 = b2/3 and x2 = (b1-2b2) / 4.  Option 2 is false, since b1 y1 + b2 y2 ≥ b2 (2 y1 + y2) = b2 (6 y1 + 3 y2) / 3, so if the right-hand side is positive, the left-hand side must be positive too.
 Otherwise, option 1 is false, since the unique solution of the linear equations is not weakly positive. But in this case, option 2 is true:   
 If b2 < 0, then we can take e.g. y1 = 0 and y2 = 1.
 If b1 − 2b2 < 0, then, for some number B > 0, b1 = 2b2 − B, so: b1 y1 + b2 y2 = 2 b2 y1 + b2 y2 − B y1 = b2 (6 y1 + 3 y2) / 3 − B y1. Thus we can take, for example, y1 = 1, y2 = −2.

Geometric interpretation 

 

Observe that  is the set of the vectors  for which the first assertion in the statement of Farkas' lemma holds.

In terms of these vectors, Farkas' lemma states that exactly one of the following two statements is true:
 There exist non-negative coefficients  such that .

The hyperplane normal to this vector has the vectors  on one side and the vector  on the other side.

For example, let n, m = 2, a1 = (1, 0)T, and a2 = (1, 1)T. The convex cone spanned by a1 and a2 can be seen as a wedge-shaped slice of the first quadrant in the xy plane. Now, suppose b = (0, 1). Certainly, b is not in the convex cone a1x1 + a2x2. Hence, there must be a separating hyperplane. Let y = (1, −1)T. We can see that a1 · y = 1, a2 · y = 0, and b · y = −1. Hence, the hyperplane with normal y indeed separates the convex cone a1x1 + a2x2 from b.

Logic interpretation 
A particularly suggestive and easy-to-remember version is the following: if a set of linear inequalities has no solution, then a contradiction can be produced from it by linear combination with nonnegative coefficients. Note that  is a combination of the left-hand sides,  a combination of the right-hand side of the inequalities. Since the positive combination produces a zero vector on the left and a −1 on the right, the contradiction is apparent.

Thus, Farkas' lemma can be viewed as a theorem of logical completeness:  ≤  is a set of "axioms", the linear combinations are the "derivation rules", and the lemma says that, if the set of axioms is inconsistent, then it can be refuted using the derivation rules.

Variants 
The Farkas Lemma has several variants with different sign constraints (the first one is the original version):

The latter variant is mentioned for completeness; it is not actually a "Farkas lemma" since it contains only equalities. Its proof is an exercise in linear algebra.

Generalizations 

Generalized Farkas' lemma can be interpreted geometrically as follows: either a vector is in a given closed convex cone, or there exists a hyperplane separating the vector from the cone; there are no other possibilities. The closedness condition is necessary, see Separation theorem I in Hyperplane separation theorem. For original Farkas' lemma,  is the nonnegative orthant , hence the closedness condition holds automatically. Indeed, for polyhedral convex cone, i.e., there  exists a   such that , the closedness condition holds automatically. In convex optimization, various kinds of constraint qualification, e.g. Slater's condition, are responsible for closedness of the underlying convex cone .

Further implications 
Farkas's lemma can be varied to many further theorems of alternative by simple modifications, such as Gordan's theorem: Either  has a solution x, or  has a nonzero solution y with y ≥ 0.

Common applications of Farkas' lemma include proving the strong duality theorem associated with linear programming and the Karush–Kuhn–Tucker conditions. An extension of Farkas' lemma can be used to analyze the strong duality conditions for and construct the dual of a semidefinite program. It is sufficient to prove the existence of the Karush–Kuhn–Tucker conditions using the Fredholm alternative but for the condition to be necessary, one must apply von Neumann's minimax theorem to show the equations derived by Cauchy are not violated.

See also 
 Dual linear program
 Fourier–Motzkin elimination – can be used to prove Farkas' lemma.

Notes

Further reading 
 
 
 Kutateladze S.S. The Farkas lemma revisited. Siberian Mathematical Journal, 2010, Vol. 51, No. 1, 78–87.
Lemmas in linear algebra
Convex analysis
Linear programming